Aleksey Alekseyevich Frantsuzov (Алексей Алексеевич Французов, born 16 October 1971) is a Russian male handball player. He was a member of the Russia men's national handball team. He was part of the  team at the 1996 Summer Olympics, playing one match. On club level he played for Polet Sports Club.

References

1971 births
Living people
Russian male handball players
Handball players at the 1996 Summer Olympics
Olympic handball players of Russia
Sportspeople from Chelyabinsk